The 2020–21 EHF Champions League knockout stage began on 31 March with the playoffs and ended on 13 June 2021 with the final at the Lanxess Arena in Cologne, Germany, to decide the winners of the 2020–21 EHF Champions League. On 10 February 2021, after a decision by the EHF Executive Committee, it was announced that all 16 teams advance from the group stage.

Format
In the Play-offs, the first-placed team from one group faced the eighth-placed team from the other group, the second-placed team faced the seventh-placed and so on. The eight winning teams advanced to the quarterfinals. The four quarterfinal winners qualified for the final four tournament at the Lanxess Arena in Cologne, Germany.

Qualified teams

Play-offs
On 29 March 2021 the European Handball Federation has issued an overview on what happens if matches cannot be played in the upcoming play-offs of the EHF Champions League Men due to reasons related to the COVID-19 pandemic. If a team reports positive cases of COVID-19 and the match could not be played, this pairing would be decided by playing both matches (1st and 2nd leg) as a so called ‘double game’ before 8 April 2021, the date when the last second-leg matches are scheduled. If a second-leg match was not played on 7–8 April 2021, as a consequence of this and following the principle that the party responsible is liable for, in this case, the fact that the match cannot be played, a team which was not in the position to play its scheduled game on the second weekend would be excluded from the competition regardless of the result in the first-leg game. The opponents would subsequently qualify for the quarter-finals.

Overview

|}

Matches

HBC Nantes won 58–56 on aggregate.

THW Kiel won 66–56 on aggregate.

Meshkov Brest won 60–55 on aggregate.

56–56 on aggregate. Aalborg Håndbold won on away goals

Barça won 76–44 on aggregate.

Paris Saint-Germain won 68–47 on aggregate.

Telekom Veszprém won 80–57 on aggregate.

Quarterfinals

Overview

|}

Matches

HBC Nantes won 62–60 on aggregate.

Paris Saint-Germain won 63–59 on aggregate.

Barça won 73–57 on aggregate.

Aalborg Håndbold won 55–54 on aggregate.

Final four
The final four was held at the Lanxess Arena in Cologne, Germany on 12 and 13 June 2021. The draw was held on 25 May 2021.

Bracket

Semifinals

Third place game

Final

Notes

References

External links
Final4 Official website

knockout stage